Glencull is a townland in County Tyrone, Northern Ireland. It is situated in the historic barony of Dungannon Lower and the civil parish of Errigal Ciaran and covers an area of 241 acres.

Education
The townland contains St Malachys Glencull Primary School. The school was opened in 1833 and pupils included poets John Montague and Patrick Farrell.

See also
List of townlands of County Tyrone

References

Townlands of County Tyrone
Civil parish of Killeeshil